The Women's 10 kilometre freestyle competition at the FIS Nordic World Ski Championships 2023 was held on 22 and 28 February 2023.

Results

Final
The final was started at 12:30.

Qualification
The qualification was started on 22 February at 12:00.

References

Women's 10 kilometre freestyle